This is a list of Bundesliga top scorers season by season. Since 1966, a trophy sponsored by the German football magazine Kicker, shaped in the form of a miniature artillery piece, has been awarded to the top scorer at the end of each season. It is formally named the "Kicker-Torjägerkanone" (literally "kicker top scorer cannon"). Robert Lewandowski holds the record for most goals in a single season, with 41 goals scored in the 2020–21 campaign. Robert Lewandowski and Gerd Müller are the record holders for the most awards won, with seven. The latest recipient of the award is Robert Lewandowski of Bayern Munich, his record fifth consecutive win.

Winners
Key

Multiple winners

See also
List of Bundesliga top scorers
Capocannoniere
Premier League Golden Boot
Bola de Prata (Portugal)
List of La Liga top scorers
Pichichi Trophy
List of Süper Lig top scorers
European Golden Shoe
List of Ligue 1 top scorers

References

Top scorers
Germany
Association football player non-biographical articles